Murdannia spirata, common name Asiatic dewflower, is a tropical plant species native to China, India, Southeast Asia and the islands of the Pacific. It is now also naturalized in Florida, first collected there from the wild in 1965. In Asia, it is found in forests and in wet wastelands, often along streams. In Florida, it has been collected from palm hummocks and marshes in and just north of the Everglades.

Murdannia spirata is a perennial herb with narrowly ovate to lanceolate clasping leaves and pale blue flowers.

References

Commelinaceae
Flora of China
Flora of tropical Asia
Flora of the Pacific
Taxa named by Carl Linnaeus